Ele or ELE may refer to:

People 
 Ele Alenius (1925–2022), Finnish politician
 Ele Keats (born 1973), American actress
 Ele Opeloge (born 1985), Samoan weightlifter
 Rodrigue Ele (born 1998), Cameroonian footballer

Music
 Ele (album), by Vladislav Delay
 Extinction Level Event: The Final World Front, an album by American hip-hop artist Busta Rhymes

Other uses 
 Éile, a medieval Irish petty kingdom
 Elmers End station (National Rail station code ELE)
 English Language Evenings, a public lecture series
 Euler–Lagrange equation, a description of the motion of a mechanical system
 European Lunar Explorer, a planned Romanian Lunar lander
 Español Lengua Extranjera, an acronym for teaching Spanish as a second or foreign language
 Ele, a personal pronoun in Portuguese

See also
 Extinction Level Event (disambiguation)